The 1900 South Carolina Gamecocks football team represented South Carolina College—now known as the University of South Carolina–as an independent during the 1900 college football season. Led by Irving O. Hunt in his second and final season as head coach, South Carolina compiled a record of 4–3.

Schedule

References

South Carolina
South Carolina Gamecocks football seasons
{South Carolina Gamecocks football